A United States Assistant Secretary of the Treasury is one of several positions in the United States Department of the Treasury, serving under the United States Secretary of the Treasury.

History

According to U.S. statute, there are eight Assistant Secretaries of the Treasury appointed by the President of the United States with the advice and consent of the United States Senate. There are two more Assistant Secretaries (Public Affairs and Management), appointed by the President, which do not require confirmation. Additionally there are two Deputy Under Secretaries of the Treasury (Legislative Affairs, and International Finance and Development) that may also be and typically are designated Assistant Secretaries by the President. Furthermore The Emergency Economic Stabilization Act of 2008 specified that one Assistant Secretary take on a specific role: Assistant Secretary of the Treasury for Financial Stability. This role was abolished in June 2014 with the resignation of Timothy Massad. According to statute, the Fiscal Assistant Secretary is appointed by the United States Secretary of the Treasury.

Current Assistant Secretaries
The Assistant Secretary positions are:

 Reporting directly to the Secretary of the Treasury and Deputy Secretary of the Treasury:
 Assistant Secretary of the Treasury for Economic Policy
 Assistant Secretary/Deputy Under Secretary of the Treasury for Legislative Affairs
 Assistant Secretary of the Treasury for Management & Chief Financial Officer
 Assistant Secretary of the Treasury for Public Affairs
 Assistant Secretary of the Treasury for Tax Policy
 Reports to the Under Secretary of the Treasury for Domestic Finance:
 Assistant Secretary of the Treasury for Financial Institutions
 Assistant Secretary of the Treasury for Financial Markets
 Fiscal Assistant Secretary of the Treasury
 Reports to the Under Secretary of the Treasury for International Affairs:
 Assistant Secretary/Deputy Under Secretary of the Treasury for International Finance and Development
 Assistant Secretary of the Treasury for International Markets
 Assistant Secretary of the Treasury for Investment Security
 Reports to the Under Secretary of the Treasury for Terrorism and Financial Intelligence
 Assistant Secretary of the Treasury for Intelligence and Analysis
 Assistant Secretary of the Treasury for Terrorist Financing

Defunct offices including the designation of Assistant Secretary of the Treasury
 Assistant Secretary of the Treasury for Financial Stability

References

External links

Assistant Secretary